The Mixed 10 metre air rifle prone SH2 event at the 2012 Summer Paralympics took place on 1 September at the Royal Artillery Barracks in Woolwich.

Format
The event features both male and female athletes and consists of two rounds: a qualifier and a final. In the qualifier, each shooter fires 60 shots with an air rifle at 10 metres distance from the prone position, using a spring-mounted stand to replicate the movement of the front hand. Scores for each shot are in increments of 1, with a maximum score of 10.

The top 8 shooters in the qualifying round move on to the final round. There, they fire an additional 10 shots. These shots score in increments of .1, with a maximum score of 10.9. The total score from all 70 shots is used to determine final ranking.

Qualification round

Green qualifies for the final

Final

References

Shooting at the 2012 Summer Paralympics